Schönefeld may refer to:

Places in Germany
Schönefeld, a municipality of Brandenburg near Berlin
Leipzig-Schönefeld, a quarter of Leipzig, Saxony
Schönefeld (Beelitz), a village in the town Beelitz, Brandenburg
Schönefeld (Niedergörsdorf), a village in the municipality Niedergörsdorf, Brandenburg 
Schönefeld (Nuthe-Urstromtal), a village in the municipality Nuthe-Urstromtal, Brandenburg

Transportation
Berlin-Schönefeld Airport, one of Berlin's two main airports.
Berlin Schönefeld Flughafen station, the railway station of the airport
Autobahnkreuz Schönefeld, a German road interchange between the motorways A10, A13, A113

See also
Schönfeld (disambiguation)